98th Regiment may refer to:

 98th Illinois Volunteer Infantry Regiment, a unit of the Union (Northern) Army during the American Civil War
 98th Infantry, a unit of the British Indian Army
 98th Regiment of Foot (disambiguation), various units of the British Army

See also
 98th Division (disambiguation)
 98 Squadron (disambiguation)